Danger Island is the westernmost and the southernmost island of the Great Chagos Bank, which is the world's largest coral atoll structure, located in the Chagos Archipelago in the Indian Ocean.

Description
Its name in all likelihood derives from the lack of a safe anchorage, which rendered every visit to this island dangerous for the ship and crew.

History
There was never a permanent settlement on Danger Island, even at the time that the Chagos were inhabited (between the mid-18th and mid-20th centuries). However, occasionally plantation workers from other islands would be brought to this island to collect coconuts.

In 1975 there was an expedition to Danger Island by the Joint Services (JSDI). The expedition members were taken by RFA Resurgent to Eagle Islands and then by ketch and inflatable craft to Danger Island and to Three Brothers. The expedition made a topographical survey of the coral reef, an ecological survey of the corals on it and a study on the metabolism of the reef. A reference collection of samples of the flora and fauna of the area was also undertaken.

Following the Strict Nature Reserves Regulations issued on 18 September 1998, Danger Island, including its territorial waters and the reef surrounding, became a Strict Nature Reserve.

Danger Island has also been identified as an Important Bird Area by BirdLife International.  Birds for which the island is of conservation significance include red-footed boobies (3,500 breeding pairs) and brown noddies (11,000 pairs).

The 2012 Chagos Trust expedition landed on the island with some difficulty: it was necessary to swim from an inflatable offshore, and due to the strong undertow, not all were able to land.  Those who got ashore reported good tree cover including hardwood trees, especially Pisonia, and a healthy bird community. In the water they explored a shallow bank of seagrass, hoping, but without success, to find dugongs.  The 2015 expedition visited the island, landing by the same method but with less difficulty, and reported red-footed and brown Boobys and two species of crab: ghost and sally lightfoot.  They also reported turtle tracks and nest, and, in the water, good fish populations and some coral recovery following widespread coral death the previous year.

References

External links
Joint Services Expedition To Danger Island - (1975) commemorative postcard
Chagos research papers and books

Chagos Archipelago
Nature reserves
Uninhabited islands of the British Indian Ocean Territory
Important Bird Areas of the British Indian Ocean Territory
Seabird colonies